Shalini Mishra is an Indian politician from Bihar and a Member of the Bihar Legislative Assembly. Mishra won the Kesaria Constituency on the Janata Dal (United) ticket in the 2020 Bihar Legislative Assembly election. She is also the State General Secretary of Janata Dal (United) Bihar unit.

Biography 
Age - 48 (2021)
Education - Post Graduate 
Parents - Late Kamla Mishra Madhukar, Ex- MP (East Champaran)

References

Year of birth missing (living people)
Living people
Bihar MLAs 2020–2025
Janata Dal (United) politicians